Gennadi Nikolayevich Styopushkin (born June 2, 1964) is a Russian professional football coach and a former player.

Club career
As a player, he made his debut in the Soviet Second League in 1981 for FC Rostselmash Rostov-on-Don. In 1997, he played for Seongnam FC and FC Seoul of the South Korean K League, then known as Ilhwa Chunam and Anyang LG Cheetahs. In FC Seoul, he appeared only in League Cup 4 matches.

References

External links
 

1964 births
Sportspeople from Oryol
Living people
Soviet footballers
Russian footballers
FC Rostov players
Russian Premier League players
FC SKA Rostov-on-Don players
Maccabi Yavne F.C. players
Arminia Bielefeld players
FC Chernomorets Novorossiysk players
Seongnam FC players
FC Seoul players
Russian expatriate footballers
Expatriate footballers in Israel
Expatriate footballers in Germany
Expatriate footballers in South Korea
Russian football managers
FC Rostov managers
Russian Premier League managers
K League 1 players
FC Metallurg Lipetsk managers
Russian expatriate sportspeople in South Korea
FC SKA Rostov-on-Don managers
Association football midfielders
Association football defenders